Villars-sous-Dampjoux (literally Villars under Dampjoux) is a commune in the Doubs department in the Bourgogne-Franche-Comté region in eastern France.

Population

See also 
 Dampjoux
Communes of the Doubs department

References

Communes of Doubs